On Dangerous Ground is a 1915 American silent short film directed by Lucius Henderson. William Garwood stars with Violet Mersereau.

Plot summary

The plot involves a faked killing and bank robbery meant to frame a young banker, in order to cover up the villains' embezzlement.

Cast
 William Garwood as the Bank Cashier
 Violet Mersereau as the Banker's Daughter

References

External links
 

1915 films
1915 drama films
Silent American drama films
American silent short films
American black-and-white films
Films directed by Lucius J. Henderson
1915 short films
1910s American films
1910s English-language films